Official Live Bootleg is the third album and first live album by American progressive rock band Spock's Beard.  It was released in 1996, with a European release under the title The Beard Is out There in 1998.

The original North American release consisted of the four tracks from the band's debut album The Light, with the fifth song, "Thoughts" coming from their second album, Beware of Darkness.  The European release added a sixth track coming from the band's rarity collection From the Vaults, originally also from Beware of Darkness.

Track listing
All songs by Neal Morse, except where noted.
 "The Light" (N. Morse/Alan Morse) – 16:19
 "Go the Way You Go" – 12:40
 "Thoughts" – 7:05
 "The Water" – 23:12
 "On the Edge" – 7:01
 Extra track added to European release
 "Fire/Waste Away" – 6:01

Personnel
Neal Morse – Lead vocals, guitar, keyboards
Alan Morse – Guitar, backing vocals, cello, mellotron
Dave Meros – Bass guitar, backing vocals, french horn
Nick D'Virgilio –  drums, percussion, backing vocals
Ryo Okumoto – Hammond organ, mellotron

References

Spock's Beard albums
1996 live albums
Metal Blade Records live albums